Josceline de Bohon or Bohun (c. 1111–1184) was an Anglo-Norman religious leader.

Life
Josceline was a great-grandson of Humphrey de Bohun, one of the companions of William the Conqueror. Savaric FitzGeldewin, who was bishop of Bath from 1192 to 1205, was Josceline's second cousin. Josceline served Henry of Blois, bishop of Winchester, and studied law in Italy at Bologna during the 1130s. Joscelin was appointed archdeacon of Winchester in 1139 and consecrated bishop of Salisbury in 1142.

In 1170, Josceline was excommunicated by Thomas Becket, archbishop of Canterbury, ostensibly for having assisted in the coronation of Henry the Young King, son of Henry II. His case was ignored by Rome until after Becket's assassination: he was finally pardoned in 1172.

Josceline's son was Reginald, bishop of Bath. Some sources say that Reginald was born while his father was studying law in Italy, others that he might have been born before his father became a priest.

Josceline resigned his see before his death on 18 November 1184 to become a Cistercian monk at Forde Abbey in Dorset.

Notes

Citations

References

Barlow, Frank Thomas Becket Berkeley, CA:University of California Press 1986 
British History Online Bishops of Salisbury accessed on 30 October 2007
 
Morey, A. and C. N. L. Brooke, eds.  Letters and Charters of Gilbert Foliot, ed. Cambridge, 1967) p. 530.
Spear, David S. "The Norman Empire and the Secular Clergy, 1066–1204" The Journal of British Studies Volume XXI Number 2 Spring 1982 p. 1-10
 
Warren, W. L. Henry II'' Berkeley: University of California Press 1973 

1110s births
1184 deaths
Bishops of Salisbury
Archdeacons of Winchester (ancient)
12th-century English Roman Catholic bishops
Anglo-Normans
Josceline